"Head to Toe" is a song recorded by Lisa Lisa and Cult Jam that appeared on their 1987 album Spanish Fly. The song hit number one on three charts: Billboard Hot 100 on June 20, 1987, the Hot Black Singles charts on May 30 of that year, and the dance charts on May 30. In Canada, the song topped the RPM 100 national singles chart on July 25 of the same year. The song sports a retro Motown flavor mixed with the Freestyle sound for which they were known.

Composition
The song is performed in the key of D major with a tempo of 114 beats per minute. The Los Angeles Times wrote in their 1987 review of the Spanish Fly album that Head to Toe "melodically owes a debt to the Supremes’ Back in My Arms Again".

Music Videos

Charts

Weekly charts

Year-end charts

Certifications

References

1987 songs
1987 singles
Lisa Lisa and Cult Jam songs
Billboard Hot 100 number-one singles
Cashbox number-one singles
Song recordings produced by Full Force
Columbia Records singles